The 2018 Campeonato Brasileiro Série C was a football competition held in Brazil, equivalent to the third division. The competition started on 14 April and ended on 22 September 2018.

Twenty teams competed in the tournament, twelve returning from the 2017 season, four promoted from the 2017 Campeonato Brasileiro Série D (Operário Ferroviário, Globo, Atlético Acreano and Juazeirense), and four relegated from the 2017 Campeonato Brasileiro Série B (Luverdense, Santa Cruz, ABC and Náutico).

Botafogo-SP, Bragantino, Cuiabá and Operário Ferroviário qualified for the semi-finals and were promoted to the 2019 Campeonato Brasileiro Série B.

Operário Ferroviário won the title after defeating Cuiabá in the final.

Teams

Number of teams by state

Personnel

Group stage
In the group stage, each group was played on a home-and-away round-robin basis. The teams were ranked according to points (3 points for a win, 1 point for a draw, and 0 points for a loss). If tied on points, the following criteria would be used to determine the ranking: 1. Wins; 2. Goal difference; 3. Goals scored; 4. Head-to-head (if the tie is only between two teams). If tied on aggregate, the away goals rule would be used (except if both teams shared the same stadium); 5. Fewest red cards; 6. Fewest yellow cards; 7. Draw in the headquarters of the Brazilian Football Confederation (Regulations Article 15).

The top four teams of each group advanced to the quarter-finals of the knockout stages.

Group A

Results

Group B

Results

Final Stages
Starting from the quarter-finals, the teams played a single-elimination tournament with the following rules:
Each tie was played on a home-and-away two-legged basis, with the higher-seeded team hosting the second leg (Regulations Article 17).
If tied on aggregate, the away goals rule would not be used, extra time would not be played, and the penalty shoot-out was used to determine the winner (Regulations Article 16).

Starting from the semi-finals, the teams were seeded according to their performance in the tournament. The teams were ranked according to overall points. If tied on overall points, the following criteria would be used to determine the ranking: 1. Overall wins; 2. Overall goal difference; 3. Draw in the headquarters of the Brazilian Football Confederation (Regulations Article 17).

Bracket

Quarter-finals
The matches were played between 18 and 27 August 2018.

|}

Group C

Bragantino won 4–2 on aggregate and advanced to the semi-finals

Group D

Operário Ferroviário won 3–1 on aggregate and advanced to the semi-finals

Group E

Cuiabá won 4–2 on aggregate and advanced to the semi-finals

Group F

Tied 1–1 on aggregate, Botafogo-SP won on penalties and advanced to the semi-finals

Semi-finals

The matches were played between 1 and 9 September 2018.

|}

Group G

Tied 0–0 on aggregate, Operário Ferroviário won on penalties and advanced to the finals

Group H

Cuiabá won 3–0 on aggregate and advanced to the finals

Finals

The matches were played on 16 and 22 September 2018.

|}

Group I

Top goalscorers

References 

Campeonato Brasileiro Série C seasons
3